Qurkhvod (also Romanized as Qūrkhvod and Qūrkhūd) is a village in Razliq Rural District, in the Central District of Sarab County, East Azerbaijan Province, Iran. At the 2006 census, its population was 54, in 11 families.

References 

Populated places in Sarab County